= Lower Belle, West Virginia =

- Unincorporated community
- Location within West Virginia and the United States Lower Belle (the United States)
- Coordinates: 38°15′10″N 81°33′51″W
- Country: United States
- State: West Virginia
- County: Kanawha
- Elevation: 607 ft (185 m)
- Time zone: UTC-5 (Eastern (EST))
  - Summer (DST): UTC-4 (EDT)
- GNIS ID: 1555006

Lower Belle is an unincorporated community in Kanawha County, West Virginia, United States. It was also known as Piatt and West Belle.
